LoRa (from "long range") is a physical proprietary radio communication technique. It is based on spread spectrum modulation techniques derived from chirp spread spectrum (CSS) technology. It was developed by Cycleo (patent 9647718-B2), a company of Grenoble, France, later acquired by Semtech.

LoRaWAN defines the communication protocol and system architecture. LoRaWAN is an official ITU-T Y.4480 standard of the International Telecommunication Union (ITU). The continued development of the LoRaWAN protocol is managed by the open, non-profit LoRa Alliance, of which SemTech is a founding member.

Together, LoRa and LoRaWAN define a Low Power, Wide Area (LPWA) networking protocol designed to wirelessly connect battery operated devices to the internet in regional, national or global networks, and targets key Internet of things (IoT) requirements such as bi-directional communication, end-to-end security, mobility and localization services. The low power, low bit rate, and IoT use distinguish this type of network from a wireless WAN that is designed to connect users or businesses, and carry more data, using more power. The LoRaWAN data rate ranges from 0.3 kbit/s to 50 kbit/s per
channel.

Features 
LoRa uses license-free sub-gigahertz radio frequency bands EU868 (863–870/873 MHz) in Europe; AU915/AS923-1 (915–928 MHz) in South America; US915 (902–928 MHz) in North America; IN865 (865–867 MHz) in India; and AS923 (915–928 MHz) in Asia; and 2.4 GHz worldwide. LoRa enables long-range transmissions with low power consumption. The technology covers the physical layer, while other technologies and protocols such as LoRaWAN (Long Range Wide Area Network) cover the upper layers. It can achieve data rates between 0.3 kbit/s and 27 kbit/s, depending upon the spreading factor.

LoRa devices have geolocation capabilities used for trilaterating positions of devices via timestamps from gateways.

LoRa PHY
LoRa uses a proprietary spread spectrum modulation that is similar to and a derivative of chirp spread spectrum (CSS) modulation. Each symbol is represented by a cyclic shifted chirp over the frequency interval where  is the center frequency and  the bandwidth of the signal (in Hertz). The spreading factor (SF) is a selectable radio parameter from 5 to 12  and represents the number of bits sent per symbol and in addition determines how much the information is spread over time. There are  different initial frequencies of the cyclic shifted chirp (the instantaneous frequency is linearly increased and wrapped to  when it reaches the maximum frequency ). LoRa can trade off data rate for sensitivity (assuming a fixed channel bandwidth ) by selecting the SF, i.e. the amount of spread used. A lower SF corresponds to a higher data rate but a worse sensitivity, a higher SF implies a better sensitivity but a lower data rate. Compared to lower SF, sending the same amount of data with higher SF needs more transmission time, known as time-on-air. More time-on-air means that the modem is transmitting for a longer time and consuming more energy. Typical LoRa modems support transmit powers up to +22 dBm. However, the regulations of the respective country may additionally limit the allowed transmit power. Higher transmit power results in higher signal power at the receiver and hence a higher link budget, but at the cost of consuming more energy. There are measurement studies of LoRa performance with regard to energy consumption, communication distances, and medium access efficiency.

In addition, LoRa uses forward error correction coding to improve resilience against interference. LoRa's high range is characterized by high wireless link budgets of around 155 dB to 170 dB. Range extenders for LoRa are called LoRaX.

LoRaWAN
Since LoRa defines the lower physical layer, the upper networking layers were lacking. LoRaWAN is one of several protocols that were developed to define the upper layers of the network. LoRaWAN is a cloud-based medium access control (MAC) layer protocol, but acts mainly as a network layer protocol for managing communication between LPWAN gateways and end-node devices as a routing protocol, maintained by the LoRa Alliance.

LoRaWAN defines the communication protocol and system architecture for the network, while the LoRa physical layer enables the long-range communication link. LoRaWAN is also responsible for managing the communication frequencies, data rate, and power for all devices. Devices in the network are asynchronous and transmit when they have data available to send. Data transmitted by an end-node device are received by multiple gateways, which forward the data packets to a centralized network server. Data are then forwarded to application servers. The technology shows high reliability for the moderate load. However, it has some performance issues related to sending acknowledgements.

Version history 
 January 2015: 1.0
 February 2016: 1.0.1
 July 2016: 1.0.2
 October 2017: 1.1, adds Class B
 July 2018: 1.0.3
 October 2020: 1.0.4

LoRa Alliance  
The LoRa Alliance is a 501(c)(6) association created in 2015 to support LoRaWAN (long range wide-area network) protocol, as well as to ensure interoperability of all LoRaWAN products and technologies. This open, nonprofit association has over 500 members. Some members of the LoRa Alliance are IBM, Everynet, Actility, MicroChip, Orange, Cisco, KPN, Swisscom, Semtech, A2A Smart City SPA, Bouygues Telecom, Singtel, Proximus, The Things Industries and Cavagna Group. In 2018, the LoRa Alliance had over 100 LoRaWAN network operators in over 100 countries.

See also
DASH7 – a popular open alternative to LoRa
IEEE 802.11ah – non-proprietary low-power long-range standard
CC430 – an MCU & sub-1 GHz RF transceiver SoC
NB-IoT - Narrowband Internet of Things
LTE Cat M1
MIoTy – sub-GHz LPWAN technology for sensor networks
SCHC – static context header compression
Short-range device
Helium (cryptocurrency) - LoRaWAN protocol paired with blockchain technology

References

Further reading
 Olivier Bernard André Seller. "Wireless communication method" U.S. Patent No. 9,647,718. 9 September 2015.
Lee, Chang-Jae, Ki-Seon Ryu, and Beum-Joon Kim. "Periodic ranging in a wireless access system for mobile station in sleep mode." U.S. Patent No. 7,194,288. 20 March 2007.
 
Quigley, Thomas J., and Ted Rabenko. "Latency reduction in a communications system." U.S. Patent No. 7,930,000. 19 April 2011.
 Bankov, D.; Khorov, E.; Lyakhov, A. "On the Limits of LoRaWAN Channel Access". 2016 International Conference on Engineering and Telecommunication (EnT): 10–14.
Seneviratne, Pradeeka. "Beginning LoRa Radio Networks with Arduino - Build Long Range, Low Power Wireless IoT Networks." Apress, 2019, eBook , Softcover , Ed: 1

External links
 LoRa Alliance
 LoRa Developer Portal

Wireless networking
Wireless communication systems

de:Long Range Wide Area Network